Abbé Giovanni Maria Ortes (March 1713 – 1790) was a Venetian composer, economist, mathematician, Camaldolese monk, and philosopher. He is better known for his population predictions that preceded those of Malthus.

Ortes belonged to the Camaldolese monastic order. He was probably the first person, according to Adam Ferguson, to use the term "economics" for the science in which he exercised a remarkable activity, particularly in his works Economia Nazionale (1774) and Riflessioni sulla popolazione (1790), which along with other of his works were reprinted in Pietro Custodi's anthologies "Scrittori classici italiani di economia politica" (1802–16). He was opposed to mercantilism.

He anticipated certain doctrines of Adam Smith and Thomas Robert Malthus, especially the latter, as he felt that the population propagation, if it were allowed free rein, would take place in a geometric progression with a doubling every 30 years. These views were expounded in his Riflessioni sulla popolpzione delle nazioni per rapporto all' economia nazionale (Reflections on the Population of Nations in respect to National Economy), published in 1790.

No one knows exactly how he died.

Works 
 Della economia nazionale (1774)
 Sulla religione e sul governo dei popoli (1780)
 Dei fedecommessi a famiglie e chiese (1784)

References

 Alfred Sauvy, Deux techniciens, précurseurs de Malthus, Boesnier de l'Orme et Auxiron, Population, 1959, no 4.

External links 
 

1713 births
1790 deaths
18th-century composers
18th-century Italian male musicians